Echinostoma revolutum is a trematode parasites, of which the adults can infect birds and mammals, including humans. In humans, it causes echinostomiasis.

Distribution
Echinostoma revolutum is the most widely distributed species of the known 20 Echinostomatidae species; it is found in  Asia, Oceania, Europe, and the Americas. In Asian countries the disease is endemic to humans. Outbreaks have been reported in North America after travellers returned from Kenya and Tanzania.

Description
The worms are leaflike, elongated, and an average of 8.8 mm long (8.0–9.5 mm) and 1.7 mm wide (1.2–2.1 mm). When first passed in the feces, they were pinkish red and coiled in a "c" or "e" shape. The eggs in uteri were an average of 105 μm long (97–117 μm) and 63 μm wide (61–65 μm).

Life cycle

Infection of Echinostoma revolutum usually results from ingestion of raw snails or frogs that serve as an intermediate host. This parasite is predominantly found throughout North America. Two asexual generations occur in a snail or mollusc. The first snail host is penetrated by a miracidium, producing a sporocyst. Many sporocysts are produced and mother rediae emerge. Mother rediae asexually reproduce daughter rediae, which also multiply. Each rediae then develop into a cercariae, which penetrates a second host. The second host could be another snail or a tadpole, in which development into metacercaria occurs. Cercariae typically find a snail host through chemotaxis. The cercariae are attracted to the slime of the snail, which contains small peptides. The first larval stage is the miracidium, and are found to be attracted to macrocmolecular glycoconjugates associated with a possible snail host. Environmental stimuli such as light and gravity can also be used to assist in searching for a host.

Intermediate hosts
Intermediate hosts of Echinostoma revolutum include:

 Anentome helena  (formerly Clea helena)
 Bithynia funiculata 
 Bithynia siamensis siamensi 
 Corbicula producta 
 Eyriesia eyriesi 
 Filopaludina sumatrensis polygramma 
 Filopaludina martensi martensi 
 Filopaludina spp.
 Idiopoma doliaris  (formerly Filopaludina doliaris)
 Lymnaea stagnalis
 Lymnaea sp. in Thailand
 Physa occidentalis
 Radix auricularia

In humans
In Pursat Province, Cambodia, children eating undercooked snails or clams were identified as a possible source of infection in humans.

Prevalence
The first reported human infection was in Taiwan in 1929. The prevalence of Echinostoma revolutum trematodes in Taiwan during 1929–1979 varied from 0.11% to 0.65%. Small Echinostoma revolutum–endemic foci or a few cases of human infection were discovered in the People's Republic of China, Indonesia, and Thailand until 1994. However, no information is available about human Echinostoma revolutum infection after 1994, even in areas where the parasite was previously endemic. In 2007 prevalence of E. revolutum adults in school children in Pursat Province, Cambodia ranged from 7.5% to 22.4%.

Authors reported echinostomiasis as an endemic trematode infection among schoolchildren in Pursat.

Symptoms

Signs of infection in humans due to this type of fluke can result to weakness and emaciation. In cases where infection is heavy, hemorrhagic enteritis can occur.

Diagnosis
Echinostoma revolutum could be detected through observing feces containing eggs under a microscope.

Prevention

Treatment
Albendazole and praziquantel are typically prescribed to rid the parasite from the body.

References

Further reading 

Plagiorchiida
Animals described in 1802